Rokautskyia roberto-kautskyi is a species of flowering plant in the family Bromeliaceae, endemic to Brazil (the state of Espírito Santo). It was first described by Elton Leme in 1991 as Cryptanthus roberto-kautskyi.

References

roberto-kautskyi
Flora of Brazil
Plants described in 1991